Whites Branch is a  long 2nd order tributary to Cherrystone Creek in Pittsylvania County, Virginia.

Course 
Whites Branch rises in the northside of Chatham, Virginia and then flows southwest to join Cherrystone Creek in the western part of Chatham.

Watershed 
Whites Branch drains  of area, receives about 45.8 in/year of precipitation, has a wetness index of 398.30, and is about 36% forested.

See also 
 List of Virginia Rivers

References 

Rivers of Virginia
Rivers of Pittsylvania County, Virginia
Tributaries of the Roanoke River